Mahesh Bhupathi and Nenad Zimonjić were the defending champions, but Zimonjic chose not to participate, and only Bhupathi competed that year.
Bhupathi partnered with Mark Knowles, but Marcelo Melo and André Sá defeated them 7–5, 6–2, in the final.

Seeds

  Simon Aspelin /  Julian Knowle (quarterfinals)
  Mahesh Bhupathi /  Mark Knowles (final)
  Max Mirnyi /  Jamie Murray (first round)
  Marcelo Melo /  André Sá (champions)

Draw

Draw

External links
Draw

Men's Doubles